Mary Scheer (born March 19, 1963) is an American actress, comedian, screenwriter and producer, who is best known for her work throughout television. She had recurring roles as Marissa Benson on the Nickelodeon-sitcom iCarly, and as Gladys on the Disney Channel series Bunk'd. She voiced Alice the Zookeeper on DreamWorks animated series The Penguins of Madagascar, was part of the original cast on the sketch comedy show Mad TV, voiced every female character on Most Extreme Elimination Challenge and appeared in GEICO commercials.

Career
She is known for playing comedic characters in sitcoms and movies.

Mad TV
Scheer was one of the original nine cast members of Mad TV when the series debuted in 1995. She came to the show with a background in sketch comedy from her Groundling days. During her tenure, Scheer developed characters like chain smoker Mrs. Jewel Barone, Cabana Chat host Dixie Wetsworth, Connie Linder, Debbie Dander, Lily Don, and Mrs. Vigor (Killer Grandma).

Scheer also performed impressions of celebrities and public figures during her tenure on Mad TV, some of which included U.S. Attorney General Janet Reno, Demi Moore, Susan Sarandon, Kathy Griffin, Mary Tyler Moore, Ashley Olsen, Candice Bergen, Fran Drescher, Shirley MacLaine, Emma Thompson,  Sherry Stringfield, Frances Bavier, Irene Vernon, Ashley Judd, Geri Halliwell and Barbara Feldon. Other  impersonations include Barbra Streisand in the Mad TV spoof video "Terms Of Imprisonment", where she portrays Streisand as an egomaniac who abuses her co-star, Whitney Houston and Gillian Anderson's Dana Scully in the "XXX Files" sketch. Towards the end of the second season, Scheer became pregnant and was visibly pregnant at the beginning of the third season and continued to perform on the show. After giving birth, Scheer finished the third season before leaving in 1998.

Characters

Other projects 
Besides Mad TV, Scheer has appeared in several television shows. Her credits include Reno 911!, Primetime Glick, X-Chromosome, Free Ride, and Dropping Out. She had a recurring role on the Nickelodeon sitcom iCarly as Marissa Benson, the extremely overprotective mother of Nathan Kress's character Freddie Benson. The show ran from September 8, 2007, to November 23, 2012. She also reprised the same role for the iCarly reboot on Paramount+.

After leaving Mad TV, she appeared in the films Elvira's Haunted Hills, The New Women Chump Change, and It Can Always Get Worse Kathy from 2001 to 2005. She also starred as Gladys, the grumpy, lonely camp director of Camp Kikiwaka in the first 2 seasons of Bunk'd.

Besides onscreen appearances, Scheer has become a voice actress, lending her voice to numerous commercials and several animated projects like Family Guy and King of the Hill. Scheer's voice also appears in the animated feature film Batman Beyond: Return of the Joker. Scheer performed all female voices in Spike TV's humorous game show MXC (she was credited as portraying Everygirl). In season four, she became MXC'''s supervising producer.

Scheer also appeared on the Jennette McCurdy web series What's Next for Sarah?'' as Sarah's therapist.

Filmography

Film

Television

Voice acting appearances

Web series

References

External links 

Mary Scheer at Voices.com

1963 births
American film actresses
American impressionists (entertainers)
American television actresses
American voice actresses
Actresses from Detroit
American women comedians
Living people
American sketch comedians
20th-century American actresses
21st-century American actresses
20th-century American comedians
21st-century American comedians